Caffeine is a 2006 American comedy film starring Marsha Thomason, Mena Suvari, Breckin Meyer, Katherine Heigl, Mike Vogel, and Mark Pellegrino.  It revolves around relationships of the staff and patrons of the quirky Black Cat Cafe in London one day.

Plot
The staff and customers of the cafe get an extra jolt with their coffee when a commitment-shy man has a public fight with his angry ex-girlfriend, instigating a series of revelations about the eavesdropping couples nearby and their own unusual relationships; filled with eccentric personal conversations, confrontational arguments, imaginary visions, and connections between various characters.

Story
During one lunchtime at an offbeat London coffee house, the relationships of the quirky staff and several couples are suddenly turned upside down by revelations of supremely embarrassing secrets and idiosyncrasies, generally having to do with their rampaging sexual appetites. A neurotic young commitment-phobe runs into his ex-girlfriend while he's whacked out on killer dope. A high strung control freak finds out that her husband-to-be is a transvestite. A shy, hesitant young woman suffers the blind-date-from hell, an obnoxious bore who has been told she sleeps with men on the first date. A hyper-possessive boyfriend discovers that his girlfriend is an ex-porn actress. The manager's boyfriend has a ménage à trois which he says is forgivable because the girls were identical twins. As the craziness builds to hilarious conclusions, CAFFEINE interweaves these characters' hapless attempts to repair their fractured relationships while they are forced to confront issues of fidelity, betrayal, commitment and forgiveness.

Cast

Reception
The review aggregator website Rotten Tomatoes surveyed  and, categorizing the reviews as positive or negative, assessed all nine as negative for a 0 percent rating. Among the reviews, it determined an average rating of 3.20 out of 10.

References

External links
 
 
 Official Site

2006 films
2006 romantic comedy films
American romantic comedy films
2006 directorial debut films
Films scored by David Kitay
2000s English-language films
2000s American films